Jungle Patrol may refer to:

Jungle Patrol (1944 film), 1944 Australian documentary
Jungle Patrol (1948 film), 1948 American film